Julian Biggs (1920–1972) was a director and producer with the National Film Board of Canada and its first Director of English Production. Over the course of his 20-year career, he created 146 films, two of which (Herring Hunt (1953) and Paddle to the Sea (1966)) were nominated for Academy Awards. His film 23 Skidoo (1964) received two BAFTA nominations, including the BAFTA United Nations award.

Biography
Biggs was born and raised in Port Perry, in southern Ontario. When World War II broke out in 1939, he joined the Canadian Army and then transferred to the Canadian Navy, where he spent the rest of the war serving on mine-sweepers. He then attended the University of Toronto and, in 1951, was hired as a production assistant by the National Film Board of Canada. He directed his first film, The Son, a year later.

From 1956 to 1958, Biggs produced the Perspective series (paralleled by the similar series in French Passe-partout), which was 35 30-minute dramas with an emphasis on social themes such as alcoholism, drug addition, adolescence, the elderly, racial problems etc. One such film, Monkey on the Back, directed by Biggs, was a bleak, tragic story of man's unsuccessful struggle to free himself from drug addiction. Similar to Robert Anderson's Drug Addict (1948), which had been banned in the U.S., it was the type of film that caused the NFB to reconsider its role in producing socially relevant films. There was an unwritten policy and priority to shift away from social realism to the 'art' of film.

In his Film Companion, Canadian film historian Peter Morris noted that the series contained elements which later become common in direct cinema. "Perhaps the most original aspect of the films was their method of production: a light, quiet-running Auricon camera mounted on a chest harness, used on location and combined with double-system sound recording using the Sprocketape recorder. This technology sharply reduced production costs and shooting time. The style that resulted is apparent in most of the films, mostly clearly in Joe and Roxy (1957) and Night Children (1956), and clearly anticipates the later application of direct cinema to fiction. The series initially attracted a large audience, but the didactic tone of many of the film and the problems inherent in condensing high-intensity dramas into 30 minutes drove viewers away. The series was cancelled in the spring of 1958. The Candid Eye series was developed at least partially in reaction to the dramatic format of Perspective, an approach the NFB believed had lost touch with the real world."

Between 1959 and 1964, with discussion of Quebec separatism increasing and his own concerns about the future of Canadian Confederation, Biggs produced The History Makers. This was 17 short films about the political figures, Anglophone and Francophone, who founded and organized the country.

In 1966, the filmmakers' union, Syndicat général du cinéma et de la télévision (SGCT), requested greater representation and freedom from bureaucratic interference. NFB Commissioner Guy Roberge responded by creating the positions of Director of English Production, and Director of French Production, appointing Biggs and Marcel Martin, respectively, to the posts.

In 1968, Robin Spry directed Flowers on a One-Way Street, a film about the hippie revolution, 'people vs power', and a youth movement to close Toronto's Yorkville Avenue to traffic. It included a sit-in on the steps of Toronto City Hall and a tumultuous city council meeting, and was followed by an outcry against the NFB, in which police and the media accused filmmakers of organizing the protest and deliberately stoking anti-authority sentiment. Biggs pulled the film. Spry, producer Joe Koenig and the SGCT appealed to NFB Commissioner Hugo McPherson, who over-ruled Biggs. Biggs resigned as Director of English Production.

Biggs returned to directing, making the 1970 documentary A Little Fellow from Gambo: The Joey Smallwood Story, which won three 22nd Canadian Film Awards, including Best Director.

The latter would be his last film; he began to experience health issues and, in 1972, died at his home in Montreal, at age 52. He was survived by his wife Muriel and their four children.

Filmography
Directory:

The Oyster Man - documentary short, 1951 - co-director with Jean Palardy
The Son - short film, 1952 - writer, director
With the Canadians in Korea - documentary short, 1952 - writer, director
Eye Witness No. 57: Light Plane Armada, Canada's Vegetable Garden, 1953 - co-director with Grant McLean
Herring Hunt - documentary short, 1953 - director
Let's Talk About Films - documentary short, 1953 - writer, producer, director
Security Depends on You - training film, 1953 - director
On the Spot: Aviation Medicine - documentary short, 1954 - director
Basic Rescue No. 1: Five Basic Knots - training film, 1954 - co-director, co-producer with David Bairstow
Basic Rescue No. 2: The Use of Levers - training film, 1954 - co-director, co-producer with David Bairstow
Basic Rescue No. 3: The Use of Jacks - training film, 1954 - co-director, co-producer with David Bairstow
Basic Rescue No. 4: The Single Ladder - training film, 1954 - co-director, co-producer with David Bairstow
Basic Rescue No. 5: The Extension Ladder - training film, 1954 - co-director, co-producer with David Bairstow
On the Spot: College in the Wilds - documentary short, 1954 - director
On the Spot: The Doll Factory - documentary short, 1954 - director
On the Spot: Dresden Story - documentary short, 1954 - editor, director, co-producer with Gordon Burwash & Grant McLean
On the Spot: Frontier College - documentary short, 1954 - director
On the Spot: Javanese Dancing - documentary short, Bernard Devlin 1954 - producer
On the Spot: The Magnificent - documentary short, 1954 - director
On the Spot: Story of a Newspaper - documentary short, 1954 - director
On the Spot: Maritime Montage - documentary short, 1955 - co-director with Rollo Gamble
Pilgrim Geese - documentary short, 1954 - producer, director
Carnival - documentary short, 1955 - director
Chickens by the Million - documentary short, 1955 - producer, director
Dwarf Apple - documentary short, 1955 - host, producer, director
Fight Against Blight - documentary short, 1955 - producer, director
Getting Your Money's Worth in Eggs - documentary short, 1955 - producer, director
Holly - documentary short, 1955 - host, producer, director
Horse Ranch - documentary short, 1955 - host, producer, director
Important Mr. Rat - documentary short, 1955 - producer, director
Insect Lab - documentary short, 1955 - host, producer, director
Packboard & Tumpline - documentary short, 1955 - producer, director
Raising the Hogs the Market Wants - documentary short, 1955 - writer, producer, director
Raw Material - short film, 1955 - director
Soil Test - documentary short, 1955 - host, producer, director
Sunflowers - documentary short, 1955 - host, producer, director
Why Grow Fat Hogs? - documentary short, 1955 - writer, producer, director
Are People Sheep? - documentary short, 1956 - director
Back Into the Sun - documentary short, Fergus McDonell 1956 - producer
The Cage - short film, Fergus McDonell 1956 - producer
Canadians Abroad - documentary short, Don Haldane 1956 - producer
Chair of Gold - documentary short, Thomas Farley 1956 - producer
The Deserter - documentary short, 1956 - director
Embassy - documentary short, 1956 - producer
Escape - documentary short, Thomas Farley 1956 - producer
Fighter Wing - documentary short, Don Haldane 1956 - producer
Go to Blazes - documentary short, Thomas Farley 1956 - producer
The Longer Trail - short film, Fergus McDonell 1956 - producer
Man of America - documentary short, Thomas Farley 1956 - producer
Monkey on the Back - documentary short, 1956 - editor, director
Morning Incident - documentary short, Fergus McDonell 1956 - producer
The Nativity Cycle - documentary short, Fergus McDonell 1956 - producer
Night Children - documentary short, Bernard Devlin 1956 - producer
Sable Island - documentary short, Allan Wargon 1956 - producer
The Shepherd - documentary short, 1956 - writer, producer, director
The Visit - short film, Bernard Devlin 1956 - producer
Woman Alone - documentary short, 1956 - director
The Yellow Leaf - short film, Fergus McDonell 1956 - producer
Aye Follow Your Own - short film, 1957 - director
The Barrier - documentary, Thomas Farley 1957 - producer
Capital City - documentary short, Fergus McDonell 1957 - producer
Crossroads - documentary short, Don Haldane 1957 - producer
Double Verdict - documentary short, Fergus McDonell 1957 - producer
Encounter at Trinity - documentary short, Allan Wargon 1957 - producer
Fires of Envy - short film, Don Haldane 1957 - producer
The Ghost That Talked - documentary short, Don Haldane 1957 - producer
Haiti - documentary short, Léonard Forest 1957 - producer
The Happy Fugitive - documentary short, Fergus McDonell 1957 - producer
The Harvest - short film, Fergus McDonell 1957 - producer
Howard - short film, Don Haldane 1957 - producer
Joe and Roxy - short film, Don Haldane 1957 - producer
A Letter from Oxford - documentary short, 1957 - director
None But the Lonely - documentary short, Fergus McDonell 1957 - producer
One Summer's Day - documentary short, Thomas Farley 1957 - producer
The Street - short film, Fergus McDonell 1957 - producer
The Suspects - short film, Bernard Devlin 1957 - producer
Test Pilot - short film, Fergus McDonell 1957 - producer
The Trap Thief - short film, Allan Wargon 1957 - producer
Who Is Sylvia? - short film, Don Haldane 1957 - producer
The Whole World Over - documentary short, Don Haldane and Léonard Forest 1957 - writer, producer
Wolfe and Montcalm - short film, Allan Wargon 1957 - producer
Conquest of Cold - documentary short, 1958 - director
The Decision - documentary short, 1958 - director
Fire in Town - documentary short, 1958 - director
Journey from Etsa - documentary short, 1958 - director
Northwest Neighbours - documentary short, 1958 - director
People of the Peace - documentary short, 1958 - director
School for the Stage - documentary short, 1958 - director
1,500,000 of Us - documentary short, 1959 - director
Canada: World Citizen - documentary short, 1959 - director
The Good Old Days - 1959 - host, producer, director
Grassland Farming` - documentary short, Donald Wilder 1959 - producer
It's a Woman's World - documentary short, 1959 - host, producer, director
Lord Elgin: Voice of the People - short film, 1959 - director
Prairie Bonanza - documentary short, 1959 - director
Report on Cancer - documentary short, 1959 - director
U.N. in the Classroom - documentary short, Don Haldane 1959 - producer
On Prescription Only - documentary short, 1960 - director
This Electronic World - documentary short, 1960 - director
Charles Tupper: The Big Man - short film, Morten Parker 1961 - producer
Courtship - documentary, Allan Wargon 1961 - co-producer with Gordon Burwash
Four Teachers` - documentary, Donald Ginsberg 1961 - co-producer with Gordon Burwash
John A. Macdonald: The Impossible Idea - short film, Gordon Burwash 1961 - producer
Joseph Howe: The Tribune of Nova Scotia - short film, 1961 - producer, director
Lord Durham - short film, John Howe 1961 - producer
Louis-Joseph Papineau: The Demi-God - short film, Louis-Georges Carrier 1961 - producer
Robert Baldwin: A Matter of Principle - short film, John Howe 1961 - producer
William Lyon Mackenzie: A Friend to His Country - short film, 1961 - producer, director
Alexander Galt: The Stubborn Idealist - short film, 1962 - producer, director
Georges-Etienne Cartier: The Lion of Québec - short film, John Howe 1962 - producer
Canada: Animal Vaccine - documentary short, Hector Lemieux 1963 - producer
Canada: Beam Therapy - documentary short, Hector Lemieux 1963 - producer
Canada: Beef Cattle - documentary short, Hector Lemieux 1963 - producer
Canada: Calf Leather - documentary short, Hector Lemieux 1963 - producer
Canada: Fibres, Yarns and Fabrics - documentary short, Hector Lemieux 1963 - producer
Canada: Heating Units - documentary short, Hector Lemieux 1963 - producer
Canada: Human Vaccine - documentary short, Hector Lemieux 1963 - producer
Canada: Hydraulic Tracing - documentary short, Hector Lemieux 1963 - producer
Canada: Low Temperature Gas - documentary short, Hector Lemieux 1963 - producer
Canada: Pre-fab Homes - documentary short, Hector Lemieux 1963 - producer
Canada: Swine - documentary short, Hector Lemieux 1963 - producer
Canada: Tobacco - documentary short, Hector Lemieux 1963 - producer
Canada: White Goods - documentary short, Hector Lemieux 1963 - producer
The Head Men - documentary short, 1963 - co-director with John Howe
Three Apprentices - documentary short, 1963 - co-writer and -director with John Howe
Three Grandmothers - documentary short, 1963 - co-director with John Howe
Wedding Day - documentary short, 1963 - co-director with Hector Lemieux and John Howe
23 Skidoo - experimental short, 1964 - editor, producer, director
Phoebe - short film, George Kaczender 1964 - producer
Portrait of the Artist - documentary short, 1964 - co-director with Gordon Burwash and John Howe
The Stage to Three - documentary short, 1964 - writer, producer, director
Three Country Boys - documentary short, 1964 - producer, co-director with Gordon Burwash & John Kemeny
Three Fishermen - documentary short, 1964 - co-director with John Kemeny
Buster Keaton Rides Again - documentary short, John Spotton 1965 - producer
John Hirsch: A Portrait of a Man and a Theatre - documentary short, Mort Ransen 1965 - producer
Octopus Hunt - documentary short, Bernard Devlin 1965 - producer
High Steel - documentary short, Don Owen 1965 - producer
The Railrodder - short film, Gerald Potterton 1965 - producer
The Way of Science - documentary short, Guy L. Coté 1965 - producer
Each Day That Comes - documentary short, Graham Parker 1966 - producer
Paddle to the Sea - documentary short, Bill Mason 1966 - producer 
Notes for a Film About Donna & Gail - short film, Don Owen 1966 - producer 
Anti-Submarine Warfare: Maritime Briefing - training film, 1967 - director
A Little Fellow from Gambo: The Joey Smallwood Story - documentary, 1970 - writer, producer, director
The Tenth Frontier, Volume 6 - anthology, 2000 - producer, director

Awards
The Son (1952) 
 5th Canadian Film Awards, Montreal: Honourable Mention, 1953

Herring Hunt (1953)
 Yorkton Film Festival, Yorkton, Saskatchewan: Second Place, Agricultural and Industrial, 1954
 6th Canadian Film Awards, Montreal: Special Mention, 1954
 26th Academy Awards, Los Angeles: Nominee: Best Live Action Short Subject, 1954

Monkey on the Back (1956) 
 8th Canadian Film Awards, Stratford, Ontario: Honourable Mention, TV Information, 1956

Man of America (1956) 
 Golden Reel International Film Festival, Film Council of America, New York: Silver Reel Award, International Understanding, 1957

Go to Blazes (1956) 
 Golden Reel International Film Festival, Film Council of America, New York: Silver Reel Award, Safety, 1957
 National Committee on Films for Safety, Chicago: Bronze Plaque, First Place, Inspirational, General, 1957

The Shepherd (1956) 
 Yorkton Film Festival, Yorkton, Saskatchewan: First Place, General Interest, 1956
 Edinburgh International Film Festival, Edinburgh, Scotland: Diploma of Merit, 1956
 Cape Town International Film Festival, Cape Town: Certificate of Merit, 1956
 Johannesburg International Film Festival, Johannesburg: Certificate of Merit, 1956
 Cork International Film Festival, Cork: Certificate of Merit, 1956
 Durban International Film Festival, Durban: Honorable Mention, 1956
 8th Canadian Film Awards, Stratford, Ontario: Honourable Mention, Theatrical Short, 1956

Fire in Town (1958) 
 11th Canadian Film Awards, Toronto: Award of Merit, Training and Instruction, 1959
 National Committee for Prevention of Child Abuse, Chicago: Certificate of Merit, 1959

William Lyon Mackenzie: A Friend to His Country (1961) 
 14th Canadian Film Awards, Toronto: Best Film, TV Information, 1962

Courtship (1961) 
 Ohio State Radio and TV Awards, Columbus,  Ohio]]: Honorable Mention, 1962

23 Skidoo (1964)
 Krakow Film Festival, Krakow: Special Mention, 1965
 British Academy Film Awards, London: Nominee: Best Short Film
 British Academy Film Awards, London: Nominee: United Nations Award for "the best film embodying one or more of the principles of the United Nations Charter in 1965".

Phoebe (1964) 
 Montreal International Film Festival, Montreal: First Prize, Short Subjects, 1965
 International Short Film Festival Oberhausen, Oberhausen: Bronze Plaque - Prize of the German Catholic Film Service, 1965
 American Film and Video Festival, New York: Blue Ribbon, Guidance, 1966
 Melbourne Film Festival, Melbourne: Diploma of Merit, 1966

Buster Keaton Rides Again (1965)
 18th Canadian Film Awards, Montreal: Best Film, General Information, 1966
 Montreal International Film Festival, Montreal: First Prize, Medium-Length Films, 1966
 Golden Gate International Film Festival, San Francisco: Silver Trophy, Documentary, 1966
 International Exhibition of the Documentary Film, Venice: CIDALC Special Prize, 1966
 American Film and Video Festival, New York: First Prize, Music, Literature & Films, 1967
 Melbourne Film Festival, Melbourne: Special Prize for Best Biographical Documentary, 1967
 MIFED International Contest of Public Relations, Milan: Gold Medal 1968
 20th British Academy Film Awards, London: Nominee: BAFTA Award for Best Documentary, 1967

High Steel (1965)
 Cork International Film Festival, Cork, Ireland: Bronze Statuette of St. Finbarr - First Prize,  Documentary, 1966
 Locarno Film Festival, Locarno, Switzerland: Diploma of Honour, 1967
 Kraków Film Festival, Kraków, Poland: Diploma of Honour, 1967
 Melbourne Film Festival, Melbourne: Diploma of Merit, 1967
 International Days of Short Films, Tours, France: Prize of the Cine-Clubs, 1967
 Berlin International Film Festival, Berlin: Special Youth Prize, 1967

The Railrodder (1965)
 Festival of Tourist and Folklore Films, Brussels: Femina Award for Cinema, 1966
 18th Canadian Film Awards, Montreal: Best Travel and Recreation Film, 1966
 Berlin International Film Festival, Berlin: Special Commendation, 1965 
 BFI London Film Festival, London: Outstanding Film of the Year, 1966
 Locarno Film Festival, Locarno, Switzerland: Diploma of Honor, 1966 
 Philadelphia International Festival of Short Films, Philadelphia: Award of Exceptional Merit, 1971 
Octopus Hunt (1965)
 Electronic, Nuclear and Teleradio Cinematographic Review, Rome: Gold Rocket, Sports Films, 1968

Paddle to the Sea (1966) 
 Yorkton Film Festival, Yorkton, Saskatchewan: First Place, Creative Arts and Experimental Films, 1967
 Salerno Film Festival, Salerno, Italy: First Prize, Information Films, 1967
 American Film and Video Festival, New York: Blue Ribbon, Stories for Children, 1967
 International Educational Film Festival, Tehran, Iran: Golden Delfan, First Prize, Educational Films for Children, 1967
 La Plata International Children's Film Festival, La Plata: Silver Plaque, 1968
 Film Critics and Journalists Association of Ceylon, Colombo, Sri Lanka: Certificate of Merit, 1969
 International Festival of Short Films, Philadelphia: Award for Exceptional Merit, 1971
 Educational Film Library Association of America, New York - Sightlines Magazine list of 10 Best Films of the Last Ten Years, 1968
 International Film & Television Festival of New York: Silver Medal, Education, Language Arts, 1987
 40th Academy Awards, Los Angeles: Nominee: Best Live Action Short Film, 1968

Each Day That Comes (1966) 
 Melbourne Film Festival, Melbourne: Diploma of Merit, 1967

Notes for a Film About Donna and Gail (1966) 
 Montreal International Film Festival, Montreal: First Prize, Medium Length, 1966
 19th Canadian Film Awards, Montreal: Genie Award for Best Film, General Information, 1967
 Melbourne Film Festival, Melbourne: Diploma of Merit, 1967

A Little Fellow from Gambo: The Joey Smallwood Story (1970)
 22nd Canadian Film Awards, Toronto: Genie Award for Best Public Affairs Film, 1970
 22nd Canadian Film Awards, Toronto: Genie Award for Best TV Information Film, 1970
 22nd Canadian Film Awards, Toronto: Best Director to Julian Biggs, 1970

References

External links

1920 births
1972 deaths
National Film Board of Canada people
Film directors from Ontario
Film producers from Ontario
University of Toronto alumni
People from Scugog
Canadian military personnel of World War II
Canadian documentary film producers
Canadian documentary film directors